Ottis Elmer Lock (July 28, 1910 - August 15, 1998) was an American politician that served in the Texas House of Representatives for District 12, he also served in the Texas Senate for District 3, he was also President pro tempore of the Texas Senate.

Personal life
Lock was born July 28, 1910 in Angelina County, Texas. He attended high school at Rusk Academy and attended Stephen F. Austin State University, where he graduated with a bachelor of science degree in history and education. He worked numerous jobs for Laneville Independent School District, during the summer time he would study law at the University of Texas and later passed the bar exam becoming an attorney. Lock enlisted in the United States Army to fight in World War II, he was a second lieutenant. He worked 15 years for Southland Paper Mills in Lufkin, Texas. He was married to Viola Williamson and they had three sons. Lock died on August 15, 1998 and is buried in Lufkin, Texas.

Political career
Lock served Texas House of Representatives District 12 during the 45th, 46th, 47th, 48th, 49th, and 50th Legislatures. He was known to be a strong advocate of public schools. Lock also served in the Texas Senate for District 3 during the 51st, 52nd, 53rd, 54th, and 55th legislatures. He was  President pro tempore of the Texas Senate during part of the 55th legislature. Lock also served as president of the Lufkin School Board. Lock was affiliated with the Democratic Party.

Civic service
Lock was involved in various civic work.
Lufkin Youth Baseball Association
State Senior Colleges Board of Regents
Texas Public Safety Commission

References

1910 births
1998 deaths
Democratic Party members of the Texas House of Representatives
20th-century American politicians
Democratic Party Texas state senators